Izeh (also Romanized as Īz̄eh; also known as Malāmir, Izaj, and Malemir) is a city and capital of Izeh County, Khuzestan Province, Iran.  At the 2006 census, its population was 103,695, in 20,127 families.

Izeh also has mines of rocks and minerals. It is famous for its dam and ancient monuments that are located in Kul-e Farah, Eshkaft-e Salman, Khongazhdar, Tagh e Tavileh, Shir-e Sangi (Stone Lion cemetery), Shahsavar relief, Khong e Kamalvand, Khong e Ajdar, Khong e Yaralivand, ghalesard village (Qalesard), and Sheyvand relief. The population of Izeh mainly consists of Bakhtiaris.

Notable people
 

Ali Landi (2007–2021), student who saved the lives of two elderly women in a fire

Climate

Izeh has a Hot-summer Mediterranean climate (Köppen Csa) with scorching, rainless summers and comfortable, somewhat wet winters with cold and often freezing mornings.

References

External links

 IḎEH, Encyclopædia Iranica
 Izeh Photo Gallery from the Khuzestan Governorship
 Ayapir at fravahr.org

Populated places in Izeh County
Cities in Khuzestan Province